Harrow tube station could refer to one of a number of London Underground stations serving the Harrow area of north London:

 Harrow-on-the-Hill
 North Harrow
 South Harrow
 West Harrow
 Harrow & Wealdstone

National Rail station Sudbury Hill Harrow is a short walk from Sudbury Hill but is a separate station.

Disambig-Class London Transport articles